Kochevino is a rural locality (a village) in Nikolotorzhskoye Rural Settlement, Kirillovsky District, Vologda Oblast, Russia. The population was 13 as of 2002.

Geography 
Kochevino is located 31 km southeast of Kirillov (the district's administrative centre) by road. Savinskoye is the nearest rural locality.

References 

Rural localities in Kirillovsky District